Ganjam district is a district in the Indian state of Odisha. Ganjam's total area is 8,206 km² (3,168 mi²).
The district headquarters is Chhatrapur. Ganjam is divided into three sub-divisions Chhatrapur, Berhampur, and Bhanjanagar. The Imperial Gazetteer of India 1908 lists Ganjam, along with the Thanjavur and South Canara districts, as the three districts of the Madras Presidency where Brahmins were most numerous.
As of 2011 it is the most populous district of Odisha (out of 30).

History
Ganjam was a part of ancient Dakshina Kalinga. The Mauryan emperor Ashoka inscribed his message at Jaugada near the banks of the Rushikulya, in the present-day Ganjam district. Scholars thus conclude that a significant part of Ganjam was under the rule of Ashoka. There are multiple theories regarding the name 'Ganjam'. During the 7th century, the region was known as Kangoda or Kongoda. Some scholars believe the word evolved from this ancient name while others suggest the name of the region likely derives from the Persian word "Ganj", meaning 'granary' or 'market' thus signifying the importance of historical ports and being the respective center of trade and commerce.

Ganjam district is one of the oldest administrative units of Odisha. It was part of Madras presidency during British rule.

Administrative setup 
The 23 Tahasils in Ganjam district under three sub-divisions are listed in the following table.

The 22 Blocks in Ganjam district under three sub-divisions are listed in the following table.

There are 39 Police Stations under the two Police Districts in Ganjam Administrative district are listed in the following table.

Economy

An important contributor to the local economy is production of extracts from Ganjam Kewda Rooh, which are used in perfumery.

Since Ganjam is a coastal district, it is well equipped with Port facilities. Port at Gopalpur and nearby industries cater economic activities of the district and Odisha state.

Demographics

According to the 2011 census Ganjam district has a population of 3,529,031, roughly equal to the nation of Lithuania or the US state of Connecticut. This gives it a ranking of 83rd in India (out of a total of 640). Its population growth rate over the decade 2001–2011 was  11.37%. Ganjam has a sex ratio of  983 females for every 1000 males, and a literacy rate of 71.88%. Scheduled Castes and Scheduled Tribes make up 19.50% and 3.37% of the population respectively.

At the time of the 2011 Census of India, 91.29% of the population in the district spoke Odia, 7.17% Telugu, 0.44% Kui and 0.42% Sora as their first language.

Politics

Vidhan Sabha constituencies

The following is the Vidhan Sabha constituencies of Ganjam and the elected members of the area

Lok Sabha constituencies

Since 2008, Ganjam district is represented in Berhampur (Lok Sabha constituency) and Aska (Lok Sabha constituency).

Berhampur seat earlier Ganjam (Lok Sabha constituency)  exist in 1952 and 1957 general elections as two seat constituency and Chatarpur (Lok Sabha constituency) exist in 1962, 1967 and 1971 general elections and later Berhanpur seat exist since 1977 general elections.

Aska seat exist since 1977 general elections and earlier as Bhanjanagar (Lok Sabha constituency) seat in 1962, 1967 and 1971 general elections

People from Ganjam district
 Kabi Samrat Upendra Bhanja, Greatest Poet
 Kabisurjya Baladeb Rath, Poet
 Bharat Ratna V.V. Giri, former President of India (4th)
 P. V. Narasimha Rao, former Prime Minister of India, elected as a member of parliament from Bramhapur constituency 
 Kalinga Vira Biju Patnaik, former Chief Minister of Odisha and former Union Cabinet minister of India 
 Naveen Patnaik : The current & 14th Chief Minister of Odisha , is also MLA(Member of Legislative Assembly) from Hinjilicut , Ganjam District, Odisha         
 Maharaja Krushna Chandra Gajapati, 1st Prime Minister of Odisha, regarded as architect of an Independent united Odisha State. He was a king of Eastern Ganga Dynasty (Paralakhemundi Branch of Gajapati district but previously it was a part of Ganjam District)
 Bishwanath Das, 2nd Prime Minister of Odisha former Governor of Uttar Pradesh and former Chief Minister of Odisha.         
 Binayak Acharya, former Chief Minister of Odisha         
 Padma Shri Kota Harinarayana, scientist, former Programme Director and Chief Designer of India's Light Combat Aircraft Tejas programme and former Vice chancellor of University of Hyderabad 
 Padma Shri Sanjukta Panigrahi, Most famous Odissi dancer         
 Padma Bhushan Waheeda Rehman, regarded as all time greatest actress of Indian cinema and dancer started her career at Ganjam Kala Parishad, Berhampur         

 Siddhanta Mahapatra, most famous & successful actor and two times member of parliament from Bramhapur constituency 
 Celina Jaitly, actress and model, studied at Khallikote Autonomous College (Now Khallikote University)
 Padma Shri Sisir Mishra, Hindi/Odia film director
 Pandit Tarini Charan Patra, Prominent Odissi musician, Guru, singer, scholar, poet, composer & Binākara (exponent of Odissi Bina)
 Pandit Ramarao patro, great Odissi musician , compose, Bina player, vocalist 
 Lisa Mishra, singer
 Sulagna Panigrahi, actress
 K Ravi Kumar, won gold in weightlifting at 2010 Commonwealth Games and also participated in 2012 London Olympics
Padma Shri P. V. S. Rao, Computer scientist 
 Justice B. Jagannadha Das, former Chief Justice of Orissa High Court
 Justice Lingaraj Panigrahi, former Chief Justice of Orissa High Court and former Speaker of Odisha Legislative Assembly
 Somanath Rath, former Speaker of Odisha Legislative Assembly
 Biswanath Pattnaik was a legendary veteran Gandhian, Sarvodaya and Bhoodan leader
 Arun K. Pati, quantum physicist
 W. V. V. B. Ramalingam, mathematics teacher and freedom fighter
 Thapi Dharma Rao, journalist, writer
 Chandra Sekhar Sahu, member of parliament of Bramhapur constituency and former union Rural Development minister 
 Ram Krushna Patnaik, Former cabinet Finance minister of Odisha and  former Member of legislative of Odisha. He was one of the founding member of Biju Janata Dal (BJD) 
 Smt. A. Laxmibai, first Woman Deputy Speaker of Odisha Legislative Assembly
 Sashi Bhusan Rath, Social reformer & Politician
Raja Harihar Mardaraj, Former king of Khallikote and freedom fighter
Nikhilanand panigrahy, writer 
  Aneppu Parasuramdas Patro: Justice Party leader and Education Minister in the Raja of Panagal Government
  Gopalakrusna Pattanayaka, poet & composer of Odissi music
  Padma Shri Krishna Mohan Pathi,orthopedic surgeon

  Harihar Panda, freedom fighter
  G. S. Melkote, freedom fighter and parliamentarian
  Goparaju Ramachandra Rao, Atheist,Freedom Fighter,Social Activist,Social Reformer
  Raja Bahadur Ramachandra Mardaraj Deo, king and freedom fighter 
  Sanskaraka Shribastha panda , freedom fighter 
  Laxmi Narayan Pattnaik, freedom fighter
  Chakara Bisoyi, freedom fighter
  Padma shri Bhagaban Sahu, folk dancer and choreographer
  Soubhagya Kumar Misra, Sahitya Akademi Award winner for his writing
  Gouri Kumar Brahma, Academician, literary critic, orator and writer
  Dr. Dinanath Pathy, Indian painter, author and art historian

References

External links 

 
  This offers a detailed history of the district, albeit from a British imperial point of view.

 
Districts of Odisha